Ondangwa Constituency was an electoral constituency in the Oshana Region of Namibia until August 2013. It had 29,783 inhabitants, its district capital was the town of Ondangwa. Following a recommendation of the Fourth Delimitation Commission of Namibia, and in preparation of the 2014 general election, the constituency was split into Ondangwa Urban and Ondangwa Rural.

The following people have served as councillors of Ondangwa constituency:
 Prinse Shiimi (1992–1998)
 Ismael Uugwanga (1999–2010)
 Alfeus Abraham (since 2011)

References

Constituencies of Oshana Region
States and territories established in 1992
1992 establishments in Namibia
States and territories disestablished in 2013
2013 disestablishments in Namibia